Charles Cottier (born 27 October 1992) is an Australian actor, perhaps best known for portraying Dexter Walker on the Australian soap opera Home and Away.

Early life
Cottier was born in Brisbane, Australia, completed primary school at Kenmore South State School and secondary school at Brisbane Boys' College. He has always wanted to be an actor, and loved performing in home videos from a young age.  He grew up in a close knit family of three boys (one older and one younger). Cottier started taking acting classes at the age of twelve at The Australian Acting Academy and graduated from secondary school in 2009, where he was drama captain.

Cottier also loves to play music, something which he inherited from his family; his dad plays guitar, his brothers play saxophone and piano, and Cottier has played drums for 10 years and was part of several indie rock bands in Brisbane, including We Were Arks, NALI and also a three piece band called Mods and Cons.

Career
Cottier auditioned for the role of Dexter Walker in Home and Away on the Gold Coast, and got a call back to come to Sydney the next day. Then the following day he found out he got the role. Cottier is the second person to play Dexter as the role was previously played by Tom Green. In 2011, Cottier was nominated for a Logie Award for Most Popular New Male Talent. Cottier left Home and Away in 2013. He joined the cast of Please Like Me in February 2014. In 2015, he appeared in the third series of Miss Fisher's Murder Mysteries with former Home and Away star, Ella Scott Lynch, who played Hayley Smith in 2005.

In 2016, featured in the Channel Seven series Wanted with Rebecca Gibney and former Home and Away co-star Stephen Peacocke. Cottier and Peacocke were reunited in the feature film Cooped Up, in which Cottier plays the lead, Jake.

Filmography

References

External links
 

1992 births
Living people
Australian male television actors
Australian male child actors
People educated at Brisbane Boys' College